Loren Hal Bouchard (born October 10, 1969) is an American animator, writer, producer, director, and composer. He is the creator of several animated TV shows such as Bob's Burgers, Lucy, the Daughter of the Devil, and Central Park. He is also the co-creator of Home Movies with Brendon Small as well as the executive producer of The Great North.

Early life
Bouchard was born in New York City to a Jewish mother and a Catholic father. He grew up in Medford, Massachusetts.

Career
A high school dropout, Bouchard was working as a bartender in 1993 when he bumped into a former grade school teacher of his, Tom Snyder, who asked if Bouchard was still drawing, and offered Bouchard a chance to work on a few animated short films Snyder was making.  The shorts developed into Bouchard's first series, Dr. Katz, Professional Therapist, which he produced. He credits Jonathan Katz, H. Jon Benjamin, and Snyder as major influences. Dr. Katz ran for six seasons, from 1995 to 2000. He also produced one season of Science Court, another animated show made by Soup2Nuts.

Towards the end of Dr. Katz, Bouchard and Brendon Small teamed up to create Home Movies. The show was picked up initially by UPN, which dropped it after five episodes; the remaining eight episodes from season one, and the subsequent three seasons, were shown on Adult Swim. The show was not renewed after the conclusion of the fourth season in 2004.

After Home Movies concluded and another Bouchard pilot, Saddle Rash, was not picked up, Bouchard created Lucy, the Daughter of the Devil. The show's pilot was created on October 30, 2005, but it was not until September 2007 that the show debuted as a weekly feature on Adult Swim. He was a consulting producer on HBO's The Ricky Gervais Show.

In 2009, Bouchard got together with King of the Hill writer and producer Jim Dauterive and developed Bob's Burgers, an animated series about a family working at a hamburger restaurant. Bouchard grew up in a working-class family full of "blue collar creatives" and created Bob's Burgers because he didn't see that kind of life represented on TV. In 2010, Fox placed the series on the primetime slate for the 2010–11 television season. A special preview aired on Thanksgiving on November 25, 2010. When the series premiered, it received mixed reviews with a Metacritic score of 54 out of 100. However, as the first season progressed and concluded and the second began, critics began giving the series praise. The show has generally been viewed as a spiritual successor to King of the Hill, which carried less emphasis on shock comedy and focused more on character-driven humor. A film adaptation based on the animated TV series was released on May 27, 2022. and serves as Bouchard's feature directorial debut.

Personal life
Bouchard lives in Los Angeles with his wife, Holly Kretschmar. The couple married on September 3, 2006. The couple have two sons.

Filmography

Series

Films

Awards and honors

References

External links
 
 

American animated film directors
American animated film producers
1969 births
Living people
Animators from New York (state)
Animators from Massachusetts
American audio engineers
American male screenwriters
American male voice actors
American television writers
American television composers
American television directors
Jewish American television composers
Jewish American writers
Male actors from Massachusetts
Male actors from New York City
American male television writers
Male television composers
People from Medford, Massachusetts
Television producers from New York City
Composers from New York City
Writers from New York City
20th-century American artists
21st-century American artists
20th-century American writers
21st-century American writers
20th-century American male writers
20th-century American pianists
Showrunners
Film directors from New York City
Film directors from Massachusetts
Screenwriters from New York (state)
Screenwriters from Massachusetts
Engineers from New York City
American male pianists
21st-century American pianists
20th-century American male musicians
21st-century American male musicians
21st-century American Jews
American musical theatre composers
Male musical theatre composers